Trevor Ogden (born 12 June 1945) is an English footballer, who played as a centre forward in the Football League for Manchester City and Doncaster Rovers.

References

External links

Manchester City F.C. players
Association football forwards
English Football League players
1945 births
Living people
Doncaster Rovers F.C. players
Witton Albion F.C. players
English footballers
People from Culcheth